Kukka Katuku Cheppu Debba is a 1979 Indian Telugu-language film starring Chiranjeevi and Madhavi. The film was remade in Tamil as Rani Theni (1982).

Cast 
Chiranjeevi
Madhavi as Parvati
 Narayana Rao
 Hema Sundar
 P. L. Narayana
 Rallapalli
 Satyannarayana Vankayala
 Pallavi as Kanakam
 Laxmikanth

Cinematography 
 R. Raghunatha Reddy

References

External links 
 

1970s Telugu-language films
1979 films
Films scored by M. S. Viswanathan
Telugu films remade in other languages